was a town located in Kaisō District, Wakayama Prefecture, Japan.

On January 1, 2006, Misato, along with the town of Nokami (also from Kaisō District), was merged to create the town of Kimino.

Misato is home to Misato Astronomical observatory. It also produces a heavy crop of fruit in the form of both Mikans and Persimmons.

External links
Official town website

Dissolved municipalities of Wakayama Prefecture
Kimino, Wakayama